Alfons Mertens (7 April 1903 – 4 September 2001) was a Belgian footballer. He played in one match for the Belgium national football team in 1930.

References

External links
 

1903 births
2001 deaths
Belgian footballers
Belgium international footballers
Place of birth missing
Association footballers not categorized by position